Ján Štajer (born 18 February 1982 in Alekšince) is a Slovak football defender who recently played for the 2. liga club FK Baník Ružiná (he joined in 2012).

External links
at fcnitra.sk
at mfkkarvina.cz

References

1982 births
Living people
Slovak footballers
Association football defenders
FC Nitra players
OFK 1948 Veľký Lapáš players
MFK Karviná players
FC DAC 1904 Dunajská Streda players
TJ Baník Ružiná players
Slovak Super Liga players
Expatriate footballers in the Czech Republic
People from Nitra District
Sportspeople from the Nitra Region